James Moody (born September 25, 1949) is an American television and film character actor. He played the tough-talking counselor/teacher Gene Daniels in Bad Boys. His first feature film role was in the 1980 hit film Fame, in which he played Mr. Farrell, a drama teacher. Moody starred in the 1983 comedy film D.C. Cab as Arnie, a member of the rival cab company, Emerald Cab. He also appeared in the 1999 drama The Best Man and as Leroy Greene, Sr. (the father) in The Last Dragon.

Moody has made some guest appearances on television shows like Law & Order. He appeared in a few episodes of that TV series, in each episode playing a different character. Moody's other appearances were Law & Order: Special Victims Unit, Law & Order: Criminal Intent, Third Watch, and New York Undercover.

Moody hails from Portsmouth, Virginia. He was a drama teacher at the LaGuardia High School of the Performing Arts and the subsequent LaGuardia High School of Music and Arts and the Performing Arts, with Adrien Brody among his more famous students. He is now a private drama coach and working actor based in New York.

Partial filmography
 Fame (1980) - Mr. Farrell
 First Family (1980) - Justice Haden
 Personal Best (1982) - Roscoe Travis
 Fighting Back (1982) - Lester Baldwin
 Bad Boys (1983) - Gene Daniels
 D.C. Cab (1983) - Arnie
 The Last Dragon (1985) - Daddy Green
 Lean on Me (1989) - Mr. Lott
 Le Grand Pardon II (1992) - Danny Williams
 Who's the Man? (1993) - Nick Crawford
 Night Falls on Manhattan (1996) - Mayor Williams
Midnight in the Garden of Good and Evil (1997) - Mr. Glover (uncredited)
 Celebrity (1998) - Security Guard
 The Best Man (1999) - Uncle Skeeter
 28 Days (2000) - Chauffeur
 Law & Order: Special Victims Unit (2005) - Support Group Therapist (Episode: "Demons")

References

External links

1949 births
Living people
American male film actors
American male television actors
African-American male actors
Male actors from Virginia
People from Portsmouth, Virginia
Fiorello H. LaGuardia High School alumni
20th-century American male actors
21st-century American male actors
21st-century African-American people
20th-century African-American people